During the 2008–09 Dutch football season, PSV Eindhoven competed in the Eredivisie.

Season summary
Despite winning the Johan Cruyff Shield, manager Huub Stevens resigned in late January. His assistant Dwight Lodeweges acted as caretaker manager for the rest of the season, leaving at the season's end to manage NEC Nijmegen.

Competitions

Eredivisie

League table

Johan Cruyff Shield

UEFA Champions League

First-team squad
Squad at end of season

Left club during season

References

Notes

PSV Eindhoven seasons
PSV Eindhoven